Grégory Delwarte (born 30 January 1978) is a Belgian former professional footballer who played as a goalkeeper.

Career
Delwarte played three seasons for Roda JC in the Dutch Eredivisie. After one season with Maasmechelen, he signed with Mons in 2001 and Dinamo București in 2003. He returned to Belgium the following year, and played for various clubs in the lower tiers. In July 2008, he returned to Mons where he signed a one-year deal. He was, however, sidelined by manager Philippe Saint-Jean due to having long hair.

He managed RES Acrenoise for two years after leaving the club as a player in 2016. He then played for Pont-à-Celles-Buzet from 2018 to 2020.

Honours
Dinamo București
Liga I: 2003–04
Cupa României: 2003–04

Tournai
Belgian Third Division: 2006–07

References

External links

 Grégory Delwarte Interview

1978 births
Living people
Belgian footballers
Roda JC Kerkrade players
K. Patro Eisden Maasmechelen players
R.A.E.C. Mons players
F.C.V. Dender E.H. players
FC Dinamo București players
K.V. Oostende players
UR La Louvière Centre players
Belgian Pro League players
Challenger Pro League players
Liga I players
Belgian expatriate sportspeople in Romania
Association football goalkeepers
R.W.D.M. Brussels F.C. players
R. Charleroi S.C. players
R.A.A. Louviéroise players
Francs Borains players
R.F.C. Tournai players
Footballers from Hainaut (province)